Nicolaas is the Dutch equivalent of the masculine given name Nicholas. Before the 19th century the name was also written Nicolaes, while Nikolaas is an uncommon variant spelling. Most people with the name use a short form in daily life, like Claas, Claes,  Klaas, Nico, and Niek. 

Notable people with the name Nicolaas or Nikolaas include:

Academics
Nicolaas Bidloo (1673–1735), Dutch personal physician to Tsar Peter the Great
Nicolaas Bloembergen (1920–2017), Dutch-American physicist and Nobel laureate
Nicolaas Bom (born 1937), Dutch electrical engineer
Nicolaas H. J. van den Boogaard (1938–1982), Dutch medievalist scholar
Nicolaas Govert de Bruijn (1918–2012), Dutch mathematician
Nicolaas Laurens Burman (1734–1793), Dutch botanist
Nicolaas Duneas (born c. 1972), South African biotech entrepreneur
Nicolaas Everaerts (1461–1532), Dutch jurist
Nicolaas Hartsoeker (1656–1725), Dutch mathematician, physicist, and microscopist
Nicolaas Heinsius the Elder (1620–1681), Dutch classical scholar and poet
Nicolaas Heinsius the Younger (1656–1718), Dutch physician and writer
Nicolaas Marinus Hugenholtz (born 1924), Dutch physicist
Nicolaas Godfried van Kampen (1921–2013), Dutch theoretical physicist
Nicolaas Kruik (1678–1754), Dutch land surveyor, cartographer, astronomer and weatherman known as Cruquius
Nicolaas Kuiper (1920–1994), Dutch mathematician
Nicolaas Meerburgh (1734–1814), Dutch botanist and botanical garden director
Nicolaas des Muliers (1564–1630), Flemish-born Dutch physician and astronomer known as Mulerius
Nicolaas Nagelkerke (born 1951), Dutch biostatistician and epidemiologist
Nicolaas M.M. Nibbering (1938–2014), Dutch chemist and mass spectrometrist
Nicolaas Wilhelmus Posthumus (1880–1960), Dutch economic historian and political scientist
Nicolaas J.M. Roozen (born 1953), Dutch economist
Nicolaas Adrianus Rupke (born 1944), Dutch historian of science
Nicolaas Stenius (1605–1670), Dutch theologian portrayed by Frans Hals
Nicolaas Jan van Strien (1946–2008), Dutch zoologist and conservationist
Nikolaas Tinbergen (1907–1988), Dutch biologist and ornithologist and Nobel Laureate
 (1880–1941), Dutch linguist and slavist

Arts
Nicolaas Bastert (1854–1939), Dutch landscape painter
Nicolaas Baur (1767–1820), Dutch marine painter
Nicolaas van Eyck (1617–1679), Flemish painter
Nikolaas van Hoy (1631–1679), Flemish  painter active in Austria
Nicolaas Wilhelm Jungmann (1872–1935), Dutch-English painter and illustrator
Nicolaas de Liemaecker (1601–1646), Flemish historical painter
Nicolaas Piemont (1644–1709), Dutch landscape painter
Nicolaas Pieneman (1809–1860), Dutch painter, art collector, lithographer, and sculptor
Nicolaas Pieneman (1880-1938), Dutch painter
Nicolaas Regnier (1591–1667), Flemish painter and art collector
Nicolaas Johannes Roosenboom (1843–1896), Dutch landscape painter
Nicolaas Roosendael (1634–1686), Dutch painter
Nicolaas Rubens, Lord of Rameyen (1618–1655), Flemish son of the painter Peter Paul Rubens
Nicolaas Verkolje (1673–1746), Dutch painter and mezzotint maker
Nicolaas van der Waay (1855–1936), Dutch decorative artist, watercolorist and lithographer

Music
Nicolaas Cornelius Carstens (1926–2016), South African accordionist and songwriter
Nicolaas Dijkshoorn (born 1960), Dutch musician and writer
Nicolaas Douwman (born 1982), Dutch DJ, record producer and songwriter
Nicolaas Maria Schilder (born 1983), Dutch singer-songwriter

Politics
 (1842–1928), Belgian politician and promoter of gymnastics
Nicolaas Debrot (1902–1981), Dutch writer and Governor of the Netherlands Antilles
Nicolaas Diederichs (1903–1978), State President and Finance Minister of South Africa
Nicolaas Geelvinck (1732–1787), President of the Dutch West India Company
Nicolaas Havenga (1882–1957), South African Finance Minister
Nicolaas Jouwe (born 1924), Papuan leader, first president of West New Guinea
Nicolaas Pierson (1839–1909), Dutch economist and Prime Minister of the Netherlands
Nicolaas II Rockox (1560–1640), Flemish knight, mayor of Antwerp
Nicolaas Smit (1837–1896), South African Boer general and politician
Nicolaas Steelink (1890–1989), Dutch American labor activist
Nicolaas Verburg (c.1620–1676), Dutch Governor of Formosa and Director General of the VOC council in Batavia
Nicolaas Frederic de Waal (1853–1932), Dutch-born Administrator of Cape Province, South Africa
Nicolaas Waterboer (1819–1896), South African leader of the Griqua people
Nicolaas Jacobus de Wet (1873–1960), South African Chief Justice and Governor-General

Religion
Nicolaas Goudanus (1517–1565), Dutch Jesuit and papal diplomat
Nicolaas Grevinckhoven (died 1632), Dutch Protestant (Remonstrant) minister
Nicolaas Godfried van Kampen (1776–1839), Dutch Mennonite author and deacon
Nicolaas van Nieuwland (1510–1580), Dutch bishop of Haarlem and abbot of Egmond Abbey
Nicolaas Pieck (1534–1572), Dutch Franciscan friar
Nicolaas Johannes Smith (1929–2010), South African minister and apartheid opponent

Sports
Nicolaas Jan Jerôme Bouvy (1892–1957), Dutch footballer
Nicolaas A.P. de Bree (1944–2016), Dutch footballer
Nicolaas G.M. van den Broek (born 1955), Dutch ice hockey player
Nicolaas Broekhuijsen (1876–1958), Dutch teacher, inventor of korfball
Nicolaas Buchly (1910–1965), Dutch track cyclist
Nicolaas R.J. Buwalda (1890–1970), Dutch footballer
Nicolaas Pieter Claesen (born 1962), Belgian footballer
Nicolaas Cortlever (1915–1995), Dutch chess master
Nikolaas Davin (born 1997), Namibian cricketer
Nicolaas Driebergen (born 1987), Dutch swimmer
Nicolaas Holzken (born 1983), Dutch kickboxer and boxer
Nicolaas van Hoorn (1904–1946), Dutch fencer
Nicolaas Immelman (born 1993), South African rugby player
Nicolaas Jacobs (born 1981), Namibian wrestler
Nicolaas Janse van Rensburg (born 1994), South African rugby player
Nicolaas de Jong (1887–1966), Dutch cyclist
Nicolaas Pieter de Jong (born 1942), Dutch sailor
Nicolaas Landeweerd (born 1954), Dutch water polo player
Nicolaas Jacobus Lee (born 1994), South African rugby player
Nicolaas "Moos" Linneman (born 1931), Dutch boxer
Nicolaas Bernardus Lutkeveld (1916–1997), Dutch javelin thrower
Nicolaas Johannes Luus (born 1977), South African rugby player
Nicolaas Meiring (born 1933), South African swimmer
Nicolaas Johannes Michel (1912–1971), Dutch footballer
Nicolaas Moerloos (1900–1944), Belgian gymnast and weightlifter
Nicolaas Nederpeld (1886–1969), Dutch fencer
Nicolaas Jacobus Oosthuizen (born 1996), South African rugby player
Nicolaas Pretorius (born 1984), South African rugby player
Nicolaas Pretorius (born 1989), South African cricketer
Nicolaas Hessel Rienks (born 1962), Dutch rower
Nicolaas Scholtz (born 1986), Namibian cricketer
Nicolaas Scholtz (born 1991), South African tennis player
Nicolaas Bernard Spits (born 1943), Dutch field hockey player 
Nicolaas J.S. Steyn (born 1985), South African rugby player
Nicolaas Tates (1915–1990), Dutch canoeist
Nicolaas Theunissen (1867–1929), South African cricketer 
Nicolaas Peter Vanos (1963–1987), American basketball player
Nicolaas C.M. Verhoeven (born 1961), Dutch cyclist
Nicolaas de Wolf (1887–1967), Dutch footballer
Nicolaas Wolmarans (1916–1994), South African boxer

Writers
Nicolaas Beets (1814–1903), Dutch theologian, writer and poet
Nicolaas Matsier (born 1945), Dutch novelist
Nicolaas Thomas Bernhard (1931–1989), Austrian novelist, playwright and poet
Nicolaas Vergunst (born 1958), South African novelist
Nicolaas Petrus van Wyk Louw (1906–1970), Afrikaans-language poet, playwright and scholar

Other
 (1813–1898), Dutch photographer active in London
Nicolaas Nieuwoudt (1929–1989), South African military commander
Nicolaas van Rensburg (1864–1926), South African Boer and prophet
Nicolaas van Staphorst (1742–1801), Dutch banker
Nicolaas Zannekin (died 1328), Flemish peasant revolutionary leader

See also

Nicolaes
Nicolaos Matussis
Nicolas

Dutch masculine given names